Goodbye: Enough Z'Nuff is the Donnie Vie's sixth solo release. It is a live album and DVD recorded during Vie's Magical History Tour after his departure from the band Enuff Z'Nuff in 2013.

Track listing 
 "For Now" 
 "Holly Wood Ya" 
 "These Days"
 "You Got A Hold Of Me (Featuring Baz Francis)
 "The Beast"
 "Rainy Day"
 "You And I" 
 "Fly High Michelle" 
 "If I Can't Have You"
 "There Goes My Heart" 
 "New Thing (Featuring Baz Francis)"
 "Time To Let You Go"
 "Someday (Featuring Baz Francis)"
 "Goodbye (Featuring Baz Francis)"

DVD track Listing 
 "My Dear Dream (Montage/New Recording)"
 "I've Fallen In Love Again"
 "Daddy's Girl (Live - Cremona)"
 "Donnie's riding a bike (Clip - Ipswich)"
 "Altered States (Live - Ahoghill)"
 "I Touch Myself (Clip Englefield Green)"
 "Black Coffee In Bed (Clip - Lucca)"
 "These Daze (Live - Ahoghill)"
 "Donnie & Baz admiring a John Lennon street drawing (Clip - Camden)"
 "Can't Take My Eyes Off You (Clip - Camden)"
 "Cat scratch (Clip - Englefield Green)"
 "That's What Love Is (Live - Englefield Green)"
 "Sanibel Island ( Live - Englefield Green)"
 "Tea-making with Baz Francis (Clip - Englefield Green)"
 "Barrie Anne Lost His Baby (Clip - Englefield Green)"
 "Time To Let You Go (Live - Englefield Green)"
 "Fuck off! (Clip - Camden)"
 "Home Tonight (Live - Englefield Green)"
 "Saying farewell (Clip - Englefield Green)"
 "Goodbye (Live - Englefield Green)"
 "New Thing (Intro)"
 "New Thing (Video)"
 "Fly High Michelle (Intro)"
 "Fly High Michelle (Video)"
 "She Wants More (Intro)"
 "She Wants More (Video)"
 "Baby Loves You (Intro)"
 "Baby Loves You (Video)"
 "Mother's Eyes (Intro)"
 "Mothers Eyes (Video)"
 "Right By Your Side (Intro)"
 "Right By Your Side (Video)"
 "You Got A Hold Of Me (Intro)"
 "You Got A Hold Of Me (Video)"
 "Bullet From A Gun (Intro)"
 "Bullet From A Gun (Video)"
 "Life Is Strange (Intro)"
 "Life Is Strange (Video)"
 "Wheels (Intro)"
 "Wheels (Video)"
 "Freak (Intro)"
 "Freak (Video)"
 "There Goes My Heart (Intro)"
 "There Goes My Heart (Video)"
 "Credits"

Personnel

Musicians 
 Donnie Vie - Vocals, Guitar
 Baz Francis - Vocals and guitar on tracks 4, 11, 13 & 14

Production 
 Lewis John - Mixing & Mastering
 Baz Francis - Mixing on tracks 4, 11, 13 & 14

References 

2014 live albums
Donnie Vie albums